Hrayr Tovmasyan (born 8 July 1970) is the former President of the Constitutional Court of Armenia, the former Minister of Justice and a Member of the National Assembly.

References 

Armenian politicians
1970 births
Living people